Major-General Robert Burrell Frederick Kinglake Goldsmith CBE, CB (21 June 1907 – 7 April 1995) was a senior British Army officer who became colonel of the Duke of Cornwall's Light Infantry.

Military career

Goldsmith was commissioned into the Duke of Cornwall's Light Infantry in 1927. He served in the Second World War as general staff officer (operations) for the Allied invasion of Sicily in June 1943 and for the Allied invasion of Italy in September 1943 before becoming Deputy Chief of Staff of the 1st Allied Airborne Army in 1944.

After the War he became commander of the 131 Infantry Brigade in 1950, Chief of Staff at Headquarters British Troops in Egypt in 1951 and Deputy Director of Personal Services in 1954. He went on to be Chief of Staff at Headquarters Western Command in 1956 and General Officer Commanding Catterick Area and Yorkshire District in 1959 before retiring in 1962.

He also served as colonel of the Duke of Cornwall's Light Infantry.

References

External links
Generals of World War II

1907 births
1995 deaths
British Army major generals
Duke of Cornwall's Light Infantry officers
British Army brigadiers of World War II
Companions of the Order of the Bath
Commanders of the Order of the British Empire